Edward Frizzell, CBE, QPM, OStJ (6 December 1918 – 25 May 1987) was HM Chief Inspector of Constabulary for Scotland from 1979 to 1983.

After wartime service with the RAF he joined the Paisley Burgh Police rising to the rank of Detective Chief Inspector. Joining the Renfrew and Bute Constabulary as a Chief Superintendent in 1968 he rose to be its Assistant Chief Constable. In 1970 he was appointed Chief Constable of the Stirling and Clackmannan Force; and in 1975 of the newly formed Central Scotland Police Service.

Notes

1918 births
1987 deaths
Officers in Scottish police forces
Scottish police officers
Chief Inspectors of Constabulary (Scotland)
Law enforcement in Scotland
Commanders of the Order of the British Empire
Scottish recipients of the Queen's Police Medal
People educated at Coatbridge High School
British Chief Constables
Royal Air Force personnel of World War II
Officers of the Order of St John